Helena Khan (23 March 1927 – 15 March 2019) was a Bangladeshi educationist and writer. She completed her Bachelor of Arts degree from Lady Brabourne College. In her career, she had served in five different government schools.

Awards
 Nurunnesa Khatun Bidyabinodini Literary Award (1976)
 Bangladesh Shishu Academy Purashkar (2001)
 Bangla Academy Literary Award (2008)
 Ekushey Padak (2010)

References

2019 deaths
1927 births
Bangladeshi women writers
Bengali-language writers
Recipients of the Ekushey Padak
Recipients of Bangla Academy Award
Place of birth missing
Lady Brabourne College alumni
Bangladeshi women academics